Talking Statues is a project created initially in 2013 by David Peter Fox in Copenhagen, Denmark involving pre-recorded voiceovers accompanying various statues available in a smartphone app. The statue of Hans Christian Andersen in the King's Garden in Copenhagen was the first talking statue in the world. Later the idea was applied in Helsinki, New York, London, San Diego, Chicago, Vilnius, Parma, Dublin, Berlin, Manchester, and others.

The project works with mobile technology and activated through a QR code found on the statue, when you scan it you will be called. You can also download our app, then you can find the Talking Statues in the world and have it talk to GPS so that they call you on your smartphone when you get close to the statue.

The project started in Kings Garden in Copenhagen, where Fox accompanied his two children Alfred and Leah to kindergarten. On the way, they passed the many statues, including H. C. Andersen, who became the first Talking Statue in the world launched on 13th of September 2013. 

In connection with the launch, a leaflet designed by Mathilde Lunderskov was published with a map of the 10 Talking Statues. The monologues were written by film director Carsten Rudolf in collaboration with David Peter Fox and the performance was made by actor Jens Jacob Tychsen. The first project was overseen from the start by Jens Peter Munk from the Municipality, who has written several books about these statues in Copenhagen. The project in 2013 was supported by the City of Copenhagen financially.

The logo for Talking Statues was first used in 2013 when the project was launched in Copenhagen. Since then, it has been used in the various countries, especially on signs and also on the project's app in Google Play and  App Store

Please contact us if we can assist you making Talking Statues in your city www.talkingstatues.com

Talking Statues is a registed trademark in Europe and USA

List of statues

Copenhagen

London
Qif codes and plaques are no longer there.

Manchester

New York

Dublin

External links
http://www.talkingstatues.com
http://www.talkingstatues.co.uk
http://www.telegraph.co.uk/travel/destinations/europe/uk/10951461/Englands-historic-statues-start-talking.html
http://londonist.com/2014/08/talking-statues-brings-london-monuments-to-life.php

Public art in England
Public art in London
2014 in art
2014 in England